Naqusan (also Romanized as Nāqūsān, Naqūsān, and Neqūsān; also known as Naghoosan and Naqūshan) is a village in Bazarjan Rural District, in the Central District of Tafresh County, Markazi Province, Iran. At the 2006 census, its population was 316, in 149 families.

References 

Populated places in Tafresh County